Mahamane Cissé (born 27 December 1993) is a professional footballer who plays for FC Nouadhibou. Born in Mali, he represents the Niger national team.

International
Cissé was born in Mali to a Malian father and Nigerien mother. He represented his country of birth at the 2013 African U-20 Championship in Algeria. However, later that year he opted to represent Niger internationally and made his debut for the Ménas on 7 September in a 2014 FIFA World Cup qualifier against Congo, scoring a goal in the 2–2 draw. After the match, Congo filed a complaint with FIFA with regards to Cissé's eligibility to play for Niger. However, FIFA confirmed that it had accepted a request for a change of association by the player, making him eligible to represent Niger internationally and rejected Congo's appeal.

International goals
Scores and results list Niger's goal tally first.

References

External links
 
 
 

1993 births
Living people
People from Gao Region
People with acquired Nigerien citizenship
Niger international footballers
Nigerien footballers
Malian footballers
Mali under-20 international footballers
Nigerien people of Malian descent
Malian people of Nigerien descent
Nigerien expatriate footballers
Malian expatriate footballers
Djoliba AC players
AC Léopards players
Ifeanyi Ubah F.C. players
AEL Kalloni F.C. players
AS Otôho players
FC Nouadhibou players
Football League (Greece) players
2013 African U-20 Championship players
Association football forwards
Nigerien expatriate sportspeople in the Republic of the Congo
Nigerien expatriate sportspeople in Greece
Nigerien expatriate sportspeople in Mauritius
Nigerien expatriate sportspeople in Nigeria
Expatriate footballers in the Republic of the Congo
Expatriate footballers in Nigeria
Expatriate footballers in Greece
Expatriate footballers in Mauritius